Anthony Steel or Tony Steel may refer to:
Anthony Steel (actor) (1920–2001), British actor
Anthony Steel (historian) (1900–1973), British historian
Anthony Steel (arts leader), active in Australia from 1972
Tony Steel (1941–2018), New Zealand rugby player and politician

See also
Tony Steele (born 1942), Australian cricketer